The National Youth Service Corps (NYSC) is a program set up by the Nigerian government during the military regime to involve Nigerian graduates in nation-building and the development of the country. There is no military conscription in Nigeria, but since 1973 graduates of universities and later polytechnics have been required to take part in the National Youth Service Corps program for one year. This is known as national service year. Ahmadu Ali served as the first Director-General of the NYSC until 1975. The incumbent Director-General is Yusha'u Dogara Ahmed.

Major General Suleiman Kazaure was appointed director general of the NYSC on 18 April 2016, and served as the 17th DG of the scheme until his redeployment to the Nigerian Army Resource Centre on 26 April 2019.

History 
NYSC was created on 22 May 1973 as an avenue for the reconciliation, reconstruction, and rebuilding of the nation after the civil war. It was established based on decree No. 24 which stated that the scheme was created "with a view to the proper encouragement and development of common ties among the youths of Nigeria and the promotion of national unity".

Operation
Corps members (participants in the National Youth Service Scheme) are posted to states other than their state of origin where they are expected to mix with people from different ethnic groups, social and family backgrounds, and learn the culture of the indigenes in the location they are posted to. This action is aimed at bringing about unity in the country and help the youths appreciate other ethnic groups.
There is an "orientation" period of approximately three weeks spent in a military controlled "camp" away from family and friends. The camps are situated across the 36 states of the federation. There is also a "passing out ceremony" at the end of the three weeks orientation camp after which corp members are posted to their Place of Primary Assignment (PPA). They are expected to work as full-time staff at their PPA with exception of one working day devoted for the execution of community development service popularly called CDS. After eleven months at their PPA, corp member are allowed one month of vacation before their final passing out ceremony where they would be issued certificates of completion.

Eligibility for service 
To be eligible to participate in the compulsory one year service, a graduate must be below or not above the age of 30 years upon graduation, or else he/she will be given a Certificate of Exemption, which is also equivalent to the NYSC Discharge Certificate. A graduate who graduated before 30 years but skipped the service year, will still be eligible since his certificate of graduation was dated before he clocked 30 years of age. NYSC is compulsory in the sense that the graduates of the country can't request an exemption by themselves, unless they are disabled, have served in the military or paramilitary for a period of more than one year or are older than 30 when they graduated. Part-time graduates (CEP) are given exemptions, since they're not allowed to serve.

Requirements for registration 
Prospective corps members should have a valid and functional email address and Nigerian (GSM) telephone number to register. A correct jamb and matriculation number is also required for locally trained graduates. Foreign trained prospective corps members should ensure that their institutions are accredited. Also, if they trained in non-English speaking countries they are expected to translate their certificates to English before uploading. It is also important to note that registrations by proxy are not allowed as every participants would be required to undergo biometrics screening.

Merit
Nigerian graduates are ineligible for employment in governmental establishments (and most private establishments) until they have completed the mandatory one year service or obtained the relevant exemptions. Graduates who are exempted from the service include those above the age of thirty and those with physical disability. During the service year, Corps members have the opportunity to learn the cultures of other people.

Objectives of the Program

The objectives of the National Youth Service Corps Program are clearly enumerated in Decree No.51 of 16 June 1993 as follows:
 To inculcate discipline in Nigerian youths by instilling in them a tradition of industry at work, and of patriotic and loyal service to Nigeria in any situation they may find themselves.
 To raise the moral tone of the Nigerian youths by giving them the opportunity to learn about higher ideals of national achievement, social and cultural improvement
 To develop in the Nigerian youths the attitudes of mind, acquired through shared experience and suitable training. which will make them more amenable to mobilisation in the national interest
 To enable Nigerian youths acquire the spirit of self reliance by encouraging them to develop skills for self employment
 To contribute to the accelerated growth of the national economy
 To develop common ties among the Nigerian youths and promote national unity and integration
 To remove prejudices, eliminate ignorance and confirm at first hand the many similarities among Nigerians of all ethnic groups
 To develop a sense of corporate existence and common destiny of the people of Nigeria.
 The equitable distribution of members of the service corps and the effective utilisation of their skills in area of national needs
 That as far as possible, youths are assigned to jobs in States other than their States of origin
 That such group of youths assigned to work together is as representative of Nigeria as far as possible
 That the Nigerian youths are exposed to the modes of living of the people in different parts of Nigeria
 That the Nigerian youths are encouraged to eschew religious intolerance by accommodating religious differences
 That members of the service corps are encouraged to seek at the end of their one-year national service, career employment all over Nigeria, thus promoting the free movement of labour
 That employers are induced partly through their experience with members of the service corps to employ more readily and on a permanent basis, qualified Nigerians, irrespective of their States of origin.

Criticisms
The program has been met with criticism from a large portion of the country and complaints from Corps members about their remuneration. A few youth carrying out the NYSC program have been killed in the regions where they were sent due to religious, ethnic or political violence.

Besides the issue of security, many have questioned the continued importance of the program and have called for a dialogue in this regard. Preemptive measures must be taken in order to avoid future incidents of violence. The integrity and nobility of the program must be upheld by addressing the aforementioned issues. Recently there was a call for the NYSC to be scrapped. The bill was sponsored by Hon Awaji-Inombek Abiante who listed insecurity in the country, incessant killing of corp members and inability of firms to retain corp members after service due to failing economy as some of the reasons why the NYSC should be scrapped. This call for the scrapping of NYSC has been met with mixed feelings. While some past leaders are against the scrapping of it because its gains overweigh its loses, some Nigerians feel the scheme has lost its use and should be scrapped to avoid endangering the lives of innocent Nigerians to insecurity and unnecessary one year stress.

References

External links

Government of Nigeria
Education in Nigeria
Youth organizations based in Nigeria